Eryxo (flourished 6th century BC) was a Greek woman, who was a Queen of Cyrenaica and was a member of The Battiads dynasty, the family that ruled Cyrenaica and Cyrene. From the ancient Greek sources, she appears to be the first Greek Cyrenaean Queen mentioned from the dynasty.

Life
Eryxo was the only daughter and youngest child to Cyrenaean Princess Critola and her father was a Cyrenaean noble whose name is unknown. Her father was murdered in 550 BC, by Learchus who became a rival to Cyrenaean King Arcesilaus II. Plutarch states her eldest brother was called Polyarchus and the historian states she had other brothers, but the historian doesn't give their names. Her maternal grandfather was the second Greek Cyrenaean King Arcesilaus I, however her maternal grandmother is unknown. Through her mother, she was a great granddaughter of the first Greek King and founder of Cyrene, Battus I.

Marital history
Before 560 BC, she married her maternal cousin Cyrenaean Prince Arcesilaus II, who was the son of Cyrenaean King Battus II who was her maternal uncle. Eryxo and Arcesilaus had a son called Battus III. Plutarch describes her as a ‘noble, modest and courteous woman’.

Succession
In 560 BC, Battus II died. Her husband Arcesilaus II became the new king. Arcesilaus’ counsel was Learchus, who had murdered her father. Learchus was secretly plotting against Arcesilaus to overthrow him. When Arcesilaus discovered that Learchus was plotting against him, he ordered Learchus and his supporters to be banished from Cyrene.

In turn Learchus, Arcesilaus and their supporters ended up in a power struggle which resulted with Learchus and his supporters defeating Arcesilaus and the Cyrenaean Army at Leucon. Learchus also poisoned and strangled Arcesilaus near Leucon and after his victory over Arcesilaus. Learchus returned to Cyrene in triumph in hope of becoming king.

Learchus became King under the false pretence, he was protecting Battus III, although by then Battus was a young man. Learchus was pretending to Eryxo's humble servant, trying to show some dignity to Battus and Eryxo, in hope that Eryxo would marry him. Learchus also wanted Battus III to be co-ruler with him.

Eryxo was taking counsel with her brothers and in the end wanted to see Learchus and gave the impression, she wanted to marry him. She sent her maid to Learchus and stated to him, to come to her at night where the union can be done.

Learchus was overjoyed by the news that Eryxo wanted to marry him and Learchus came over when Eryxo was ready. This was when that Eryxo and Polyarchus were plotting to kill Learchus in revenge for the deaths of their father and Arcesilaus. Polyarchus with two young men had swords in their hands were secretly waiting and hiding in her bedroom.

Demise of Learchus

Eryxo had asked Learchus to come to her bedroom and Learchus came unattended to Eryxo's room. As he entered, the young men fell upon Learchus and ran their swords through his body and Learchus had died. Learchus’ body was thrown over the wall and Polyarchus brought out Battus III and proclaimed him the new king. Battus reigned 550 BC-530 BC.

Reign of Battus
When Battus was proclaimed King, soldiers that served the Egyptian Pharaoh Amasis II were present. Amasis became an ally to the late Learchus. In avenging the death of Learchus, Amasis wanted to declare war on the Cyrenaeans and the Pharaoh had sent messengers to the royal family about this. It was at this time, that the mother of Amasis that died and Amasis was preparing her funeral. Polyarchus decided to travel to Egypt to state his condolences to Amasis. Eryxo and Critola would not allow Polyarchus to travel alone, and they travelled with him to save Cyrenaica.

When the three reached the court of the Egyptian Pharaoh and gave their condolences to Amasis, others admired them for the purpose of their travel. Amasis did little to applaud the chastity and fortitude of the three, so he honored Polyarchus’ mother and sister with presents and royal attendance which Amasis had sent the three back to Cyrene. Amasis withdrew his soldiers from Cyrenaica. The fate of Eryxo's afterwards is unknown.

References
 Herodotus, The Histories, Book 4.
Dictionary of Greek and Roman Biography and Mythology: Abaeus-Dysponteus
Cyrene and the Cyrenaica
Plutarch • On the Bravery of Women — Sections XVI‑XXVII
Virtues of Women
Polyaenus: Stratagems - Book 8 (b)

6th-century BC Greek women
Ancient Greek queens consort
Cyrenean Greeks